Events of 2019 in Cape Verde.

Incumbents
 Presidents: Jorge Carlos Fonseca
 Prime Minister: José Ulisses Correia e Silva

Events

Births

Deaths

References  

 
Years of the 21st century in Cape Verde
2010s in Cape Verde
Cape Verde